"Caramela" (Καραμέλα, caramel) is a Greek-language song by Greek singer Eleni Foureira and a single from the platinum edition of her fourth studio album, Vasilissa.

Personnel
 Music: Doron Medalie, Moshe Peretz, Avi Ochayon
 Lyrics: Sofia Papavasileiou, Eleni Foureira
 Direction: Pierros Andrakakos
 Photography: Giannis Daskalothanasis
 Montage: Lydia Antonova
 Production: View Master Films

Charts

Release history

Notes

References 

Eleni Foureira songs
2019 songs
Number-one singles in Greece
Greek-language songs